is a long-running TV program broadcast on NHK TV and NHK radio in Japan.

History 
Nodo Jiman ("Proud of my voice") features amateur singers who live in the locality where the competition is held. The first competition was held on the radio in 1946, just after the end of World War II. It has been featured in two Japanese movies.

Nodo Jiman celebrated its 70th anniversary in 2015. Boy band SMAP became an integral part of the celebrations, making guest appearances throughout the year. Band member Shingo Katori served as a "special MC" alongside regular presenter Sen Odagiri on the 12 April broadcast.

Overview

Regular Show 
Each week Nodo Jiman is broadcast from a different city in one of Japan's 47 prefectures; at the beginning of the show the host would announce the local venue in which the live broadcast is held, then describe the landmarks and culture of the prefecture and city hosting the broadcast.

20 contestants - each of them a solo singer, a duet, or a group of three or more - perform in each week's competition. After being introduced by the host (usually by stating his or her occupation), each contestant states his or her participation number and the name of the song he or she is performing, then has about one minute to perform. At the end of the minute, a certain number of bells are rung to rate the performance. One or two bells means the contestant sang poorly and is eliminated, while a melody of eleven bells means the contestant sang well enough and has passed.

Two special guests - well-known artists in the Japanese recording industry - appear during each broadcast. They interact with the contestants and give feedback on their performances. After all the contestants have performed, each guest performs one of his or her best songs.

Finally, all of the contestants who have passed are called to center stage, and the most outstanding of these is declared .

Annual Championship 
Every year, early March, about 15 of the best "Champions" performances the year before perform again, this time at NHK Hall, to define who will be the "Grand Champion" of the year. The annual edition entitled "NHK Nodojiman: Champion Tournament" features three special guests and The New Breed performing the live soundtrack.

Personnel 
Regular Cast
 Sen Odagiri 
 Kisei Akiyama 
 The New Breed

References

External links 
 Nodo Jiman site on NHK Online
 

1953 Japanese television series debuts
Japanese radio programs
1946 radio programme debuts
Japanese game shows
NHK original programming